Marine Transport Line (MTL) of New York, New York was a commercial steamship service started to support the needs of support charter shipping for the Maritime Commission and War Shipping Administration during World War 2. During wartime the Marine Transport Line operated Victory ships, and also a few other ships. After the war it moved to operating mostly tanker ships.  Marine Transport Line Inc. made headline news with the sinking of the SS Marine Electric in 1983, an enlarged World War 2 tanker.

World War II

Operated during World War II:
SS E. Kirby Smith
SS Harvey Cushing
 SS Adelphi Victory
 SS Alcedo (freighter sank, torpedoed February 28, 1945)
 SS Battle Creek Victory
 SS Black River (tanker)
 SS Chapel Hill Victory
 MV Halma (sank hit mine 1942)
 SS Howell E. Jackson
 SS Malchace
 SS Medina Victory
 SS Panama Victory
 MV Sheherazade (attacked and sank 1942)
 SS Trinidad Victory
 SS Trinity Victory
 SS Wheaton Victory
 SS Winthrop Victory

Korean War
 16 tankers 
 USNS Paoli (T-AO-157)

Post War
 Kentucky
 Marine Union
 SS Marine Electric, ex Musgrove Mills, Gulfmills, Jumboized T2-SE-A1 Tanker 1961 (Foundered on 12 February 1983)
 Nagano, Bulk carrier 1963
 Oswego Courage (1973)

References

Defunct shipping companies of the United States
Transport companies established in 1942
1942 establishments in New York (state)
1942 mergers and acquisitions